The 1932 Columbia Irish football team was an American football team that represented Columbia University (later renamed the University of Portland) as an independent during the 1932 college football season. In its sixth year under head coach Gene Murphy, the team compiled a 6–0–1 record. The team played its home games at Multnomah Stadium in Portland, Oregon.

Schedule

References

Columbia
Portland Pilots football seasons
Columbia Irish football
Columbia Irish football